

Kate's Cottage, Isle of Man is a cottage and one of the named corners of the Snaefell Mountain Course used in Grand Prix-style motorcycle racing along public roadways of the Isle of Man.  It has been asserted in the Isle of Man's program of Registered Buildings that the cottage was built by 1869. 

It is a former Mountain Shepherd's cottage that is situated adjacent to the 34th TT Milestone racing road-side milestone marker used on the Isle of Man TT Mountain Course near to Keppel Gate on the primary A18 Snaefell mountain road in Kirk Onchan parish, in the Isle of Man.

Keppel Gate and the A18 Snaefell Mountain Road
The A18 Snaefell Mountain Road was developed in the mid-19th century from a number of pre-existing narrow mountain roads, carting-tracks and horse-paths.

This section of the A18 Snaefell Mountain Road from the Keppel Gate to the Windy Corner was built on sections of common grazing land that were transferred to the UK Crown following the sale of the Islands feudal and manorial rights by John Murray, 4th Duke of Atholl as Governor of the Isle of Man in the period 1824-1829.  

The Tynwald Disafforesting Commission of 1860 allowed for the proposed sale of mountain land held by the UK Crown to the HM Commissioners of Woods.  A condition of sale was the building of a new mountain road from near Hillberry Corner to the Windy Corner.  This included the installation of a number of mountain gates including the Beinn-y-Phott  gate near to the Brandywell road junction and Keppel Gate.

The new mountain 'highroads' were built in the period 1864-1866, replacing and bypassing older sections of mountain tracks including the Keppel Gate section.   The section of the mountain road from the Creg-ny-Baa road junction to near Kate's Cottage was rebuilt in the period 1892-1893 and again modified in 1922.

Area of Specific Scientific Interest
The mountain land  of moorland "heath" of Keppel Gate, including Slieau Ree Mountain and Kate's Cottage is an Area of Specific Scientific Interest  (ASSI) and upland conservation "hot-spot."

Origin of name
Formal names of the building include the "Keppel Gate Cottage,"  or "Keppel Gate."  Previously, also known as the "Shepherd's Hut"  or  Tate's Cottage,  now known as Kate's Cottage.   

It has often been alluded to that a BBC commentator mistakenly referred to Tate's Cottage as Kate's Cottage. The name may have originated as a printers typesetting error with the mountain cottage at the Keppel mountain accidentally being transposed to Kate's Cottage during the printing process.
 

The property a former Mountain Shepherd's cottage, owned by the Isle of Man Department of Agriculture, Fisheries and Forestry, was sold at public auction in 1994 and is now in private ownership.

Motor-sport heritage
Contemporary photographs of the RAC Tourist Trophy races for automobiles held in the Isle of Man 1905–1922 and the Isle of Man TT races in the 1920s, show sheep-gates at Kate's Cottage and also at Keppel Gate, with the name Keppel Gate in general referred to both locations.

In 1911, the Four Inch Course was first used by the Auto-Cycling Union for the Isle of Man TT motorcycle races. This included the Keppel Gate section and Kate's Cottage and the course later became known as the 37.73 mile Isle of Man TT Mountain Course  for motor-cycle racing which has been used since 1911 for the Isle of Man TT and from 1923 for the Manx Grand Prix races.

Gallery

References

External links
Prohibited and Restricted Areas for the Isle of Man TT Races, Classic TT and Manx Grand Prix, Kate's Cottage

Kate's Cottage